The Harrisburg School District is a large, urban, public school district based in Harrisburg, Pennsylvania. The school district boundaries are coterminous with the city of Harrisburg. According to 2000 federal census data, it served a resident population of 48,950. By 2010, the district's population increased to 49,550 people.

Harrisburg public schools provide education for the city's youth, beginning with preschool through twelfth grade. In July 2000, the Pennsylvania Supreme Court issued a ruling that upholds the Education Empowerment Act adopted by the Pennsylvania General Assembly, and signed by then–Governor Tom Ridge, that permitted a change in the governance of the Harrisburg School District from an elected school board, to a board of control named by Harrisburg mayor Stephen R. Reed, and which gave the mayor direct oversight of the troubled district. It was the first time a mayor had taken on the role in the state.

Schools
The district operates the following schools for 2013–14:

Closed schools
Steele School, closed in August 2010 due to low enrollment and a district-wide budget shortfall
Hamilton School, closed in the 2011–2012 school year due to low student enrollment coupled with significant budget constraints for the district.
Lincoln School, closed in the 2011–2012 school year due to low student enrollment coupled with significant budget constraints for the district. Students will be assimilated into other district schools.
Career Technology Academy, closed by the board in the summer of 2011

References

External links
 Harrisburg School District
 Harrisburg Public School Foundation

School District
School District
School districts in Dauphin County, Pennsylvania